Teknecik is a village in the Kâhta District of Adıyaman Province in Turkey. The village is populated by Kurds of the Canbegan tribe and had a population of 88 in 2021.

References 

Kurdish settlements in Adıyaman Province
Villages in Kâhta District